Clitellio is a genus of annelids belonging to the family Naididae.

The species of this genus are found in Europe, Russian Far East and Northern America.

Species:
 Clitellio arenarius (Müller, 1776) 
 Clitellio cavernicolus  Botea, 1983

References

Naididae